Trap rock, also known as either trapp or trap, is any dark-colored, fine-grained, non-granitic intrusive or extrusive igneous rock. Types of trap rock include basalt, peridotite, diabase, and gabbro. Trapp (trap) is also used to refer to flood (plateau) basalts, e.g. the Deccan Traps and Siberian Traps. The erosion of trap rock created by the stacking of successive lava flows often created a distinct stairstep landscape from which the term trap was derived from the Swedish word trappa, which means "stairway".

The slow cooling of magma either as a sill or as a thick lava flow sometimes creates systematic vertical fractures within the resulting layer of trap rock. These fractures often form rock columns that are typically hexagonal, but also four- to eight-sided.

Uses
Trap rock, i.e. basalt or diabase, has a variety of uses. A major use for basalt is crushed rock for road and housing construction in concrete, macadam, and paving stones. Because of its insensitivity to chemical influences, resistance to mechanical stress, high dry relative density, frost resistance, and sea water resistance, trap rock is used as ballast for railroad track bed and hydraulic engineering rock (riprap) in coast and bank protection for paving embankments. It is also used for the production of cast rock that is used in corrosion and abrasion protection, as for sewage pipes and acid-resistant rocks. Other uses of trap rock include gardening and landscaping, for the production of millstones, for the production of mineral fibres (basalt wool), as a flux in ceramic masses and glazes, for the production of glass ceramics, crushed as a filter aggregate (air filtration of poison gas) in ABC bunkers, as filter bed material water treatment facilities, and ground as a soil improvement product. Trap rock has been used to construct buildings and churches: Trinity Church on the Green with trap rock quarried from Eli Whitney's quarry, is a particularly colorful example of a red-orange-brown-colored, natural-faced trap rock. It was also used for foundations and railroad beds in the New Haven area.

Examples
Well-known examples of outcropping trap rock include both intrusive sills and extrusive lava flows. They include the Palisades Sill, a Triassic, 200 Ma diabase intrusion that forms the Palisades along  of the Hudson River in New York and New Jersey. Vast areas of trap rock in the form of thick lava flows and other volcanic rocks comprise the Deccan Traps of India and Siberian Traps of Russia.

Other prominent basalt ridges, mountains, buttes, canyons, and other landscape features include:

 In North America:
 The ridges and cliffs of the Columbia River Gorge in Oregon and Washington state
 Basalt Mountain in Colorado, for which the town of Basalt, Colorado is named. 
 The Metacomet Ridge of Connecticut and Massachusetts.
 The Watchung Mountains of New Jersey
 Devils Postpile National Monument and other parts of California's inner coastal range.
 Most of the Hawaiian Islands and their mountains are composed of basalt or similar volcanic rock.
 The Green Gardens region of Gros Morne National Park in Newfoundland
 The Emeishan Traps in China
 Giant's Causeway in Ireland
 Organ Pipes National Park in Australia
 The Paraná and Etendeka Traps of Brazil
 The island of Surtsey in Iceland, a new (1963) volcanic island.
 The Vilyuy Traps of Russia

See also
 
 List of flood basalt provinces

References 

Igneous petrology
 
Igneous intrusions
Mafic intrusions